Lucie Memba Bos (born 1987) is a Cameroonian actress, movie producer who have starred in both series and movies in French and English language. She was honored for best lead actress in Cinema of Cameroon  for French speaking actress at Cameroon Movies Merit Award (CMMA) 2013 edition organized by Fred Keyanti.  She did her International debut with Nollywood stars in the movie Pink Poison featuring Jim Iyke and Far starred alongside Nigerian Dakore Akande.
In 2014 she launched L.M.B production after her name [Lucie Memba Bos].Producing the Cameroon movie Paradise, still in 2014. she co-produce La patrie d’abord,  the first film of war in tribute to the Cameroonian defense forces under her production. In September, 2017 she was nominated as best Cameroonian female actor for le TROPHEES FRANCOPHONES DU CINEMA in the film La Patrie D'abord.

Early life
Lucie was born in Dschang West Region (Cameroon) and grew up in Bafoussam where she started modeling and diverted into acting, after her degree in Baccalauréat philosophique, she moved to Douala for other opportunities. No information about her real date of birth has been published, some sources says; she was born in 1987.

Career
Lucie first appeared in "Emoin A Seduire" in 1999 when Cinema of Cameroon was still developing.She became prominent in 2008 and won the Cameroon Movies Merit Award (CMMA) as best actress in French speaking in 2013, she launched her own production Lucie Memba Bos (LMB). She is the producer of the Cameroon movie Paradise, her work was recognized as the lead and co-producer for the movie La patrie d’abord,  the first film of war in tribute to the Cameroonian defense forces and still in 2014, she co-produced "Ntah Napi" which won the Ecrans Noirs award in 2014 for best French movie She is one of those good-luck Cameroonian actors whose work has been recognized by the ministry of culture, she was among the casts to meet with minister Ama Tutu Muna  who visited casts on set in the movie Pink Poison in Buea, 2013.
In 2016, she was recognized as the most Glamorous Actress by a Cameroonian celeb website Le Film Camerounais Lucie, is also recognized for the movie Fast Life with French actor Thomas Nguijol. She is also working with (Tribe Africa Media)  to support and show love for Albinism in Cameroon as commemoration of World Albino's day celebration
In September 2017, Lucie took a lead role in a new movie coming up with Nigerian movie star Zack Orji in an interview by Dcoded TV,  to know how she feels to work with Zack Orji, she says Apart from her career in movie, in 2008 she was employed to work with Guinness Cameroon as a marketing agent

Personal life 
In September 2017, Lucie met with Cameroonian football legend Samuel Eto'o in Douala

Selected filmography

2011 – 2020

 Chart of God
  Deiting the sixth
  Ntah napi 1 de Ousmane Stéphane et Sergio Marcello
  W.a.k.a
  First country
  La maladie
  Mission secrete
  Far With Dakore Akande
  Pink Poison  with Jim Iyke
 Le Blanc D’Eyanga 2 with Thierry Ntamack 
 La Partrie D’abord
 Fast Life

2009
  Sweet home de Ghislain Amougou 
  Passion.Com de Serge Kendjo

2008
  Série Paradis d' Ousmane Stéphane
  Série Le Monde De Loïc, De Raphaël Matouke
  Virus Squad

Awards and recognition

See also 
 List of Cameroonian Actors
 Cinema of Cameroon

References

External links
 

Cameroonian film producers
Living people
Cameroonian film directors
Cameroonian women film directors
Cameroonian women film producers
Cameroonian actresses
1987 births